Rajaa Mohammed  (born October 4, 1962) is a Kuwaiti actress and singer who started acting at the end of 1978.

Series 
 Ila Abi w Amwi Maa Althih (1979-1982)
 Ahlam Saghrih (1982)
 Khalti qmasha (1983)

Songs 
 "Arz Meknes" (1983)

References

1962 births
Living people
20th-century Kuwaiti actresses
Kuwaiti television actresses
Place of birth missing (living people)
Kuwaiti people of Syrian descent